In political philosophy, the phrase consent of the governed refers to the idea that a government's legitimacy and moral right to use state power is justified and lawful only when consented to by the people  or society over which that political power is exercised. This theory of consent is historically contrasted to the divine right of kings and had often been invoked against the legitimacy of colonialism. Article 21 of the United Nations' 1948 Universal Declaration of Human Rights states that "The will of the people shall be the basis of the authority of government".

History
Perhaps the earliest utterance of consent of the governed appears in the writings of Scottish Catholic priest and Franciscan friar Duns Scotus, who proposed this in his work Ordinatio in the 1290s. Scotus's lengthy writing in theology have largely overshadowed this notable contribution that he made to early political theory. It is believed these writings influenced Declaration of Arbroath in 1320   

In his 1937 book A History of Political Theory, George Sabine collected the views of many political theorists on consent of the governed. He notes the idea mentioned in 1433 by Nicholas of Cusa in De Concordantia Catholica. In 1579 an influential Huguenot tract Vindiciae contra tyrannos was published which Sabine paraphrases: "The people lay down the conditions which the king is bound to fulfill. Hence they are bound to obedience only conditionally, namely, upon receiving the protection of just and lawful government…the power of the ruler is delegated by the people and continues only with their consent." In England, the Levellers also held to this principle of government.

John Milton wrote

Similarly, Sabine notes the position of John Locke in Essay concerning Human Understanding: 

However, with David Hume a contrary voice is heard. Sabine interprets Hume's skepticism by noting

Sabine revived the concept from its status as a political myth after Hume, by referring to Thomas Hill Green. Green wrote that government required "will not force" for administration.  As put by Sabine,

Consent of the governed, within the social liberalism of T. H. Green, was also described by Paul Harris:

In the United States of America
"Consent of the governed" is a phrase found in the United States Declaration of Independence.

Using thinking similar to that of John Locke, the founders of the United States believed in a state built upon the consent of "free and equal" citizens; a state otherwise conceived would lack legitimacy and rational-legal authority. This was expressed, among other places, in the 2nd paragraph of the Declaration of Independence (emphasis added):

However the "consent of the governed" was flawed in that it was limited to propertied white men only.

In the earlier Virginia Declaration of Rights, especially Section 6, quoted below, Founding Father George Mason wrote:

That elections of members to serve as representatives of the people, in assembly, ought to be free; and that all men, having sufficient evidence of permanent common interest with, the attachment to, the community, have the right of suffrage, and cannot be taxed or deprived of their property for public uses without their own consent, or that of their representatives so elected, nor bound by any law to which they have not, in like manner, assented, for the public good."

Although the Continental Congress at the outset of the American Revolution had no explicit legal authority to govern, it was delegated by the states with all the functions of a national government, such as appointing ambassadors, signing treaties, raising armies, appointing generals, obtaining loans from Europe, issuing paper money (i.e.  continentals), and disbursing funds. The Congress had no authority to levy taxes, and was required to request money, supplies, and troops from the states to support the war effort. Individual states frequently ignored these requests. According to the Cyclopædia of Political Science. New York: Maynard, Merrill, and Co., 1899, commenting on the source of the Congress' power:

The appointment of the delegates to both these congresses was generally by popular conventions, though in some instances by state assemblies. But in neither case can the appointing body be considered the original depositary of the power by which the delegates acted; for the conventions were either self-appointed "committees of safety" or hastily assembled popular gatherings, including but a small fraction of the population to be represented, and the state assemblies had no right to surrender to another body one atom of the power which had been granted to them or to create a new power which should govern the people without their will. The source of the powers of congress is to be sought solely in the acquiescence of the people, without which every congressional resolution, with or without the benediction of popular conventions or state legislatures, would have been a mere brutum fulmen; and, as the congress unquestionably exercised national powers, operating over the whole country, the conclusion is inevitable that the will of the whole people is the source of the national government in the United States, even from its first imperfect appearance in the second continental congress...

Types of consent

Unanimous consent
A key question is whether the unanimous consent of the governed is required; if so, this would imply the right of secession for those who do not want to be governed by a particular collective. All democratic governments today allow decisions to be made even over the dissent of a minority of voters which, in some theorists' view, calls into question whether said governments can rightfully claim, in all circumstances, to act with the consent of the governed.

Hypothetical consent
The theory of hypothetical consent of the governed holds that one's obligation to obey government depends on whether the government is such that one ought to consent to it, or whether the people, if placed in a state of nature without government, would agree to said government. This theory has been rejected by some scholars, who argue that since government itself can commit aggression, creating a government to safeguard the people from aggression would be similar to the people, if given the choice of what animals to be attacked by, trading "polecats and foxes for a lion", a trade that they would not make.

Engineered consent

According to the propagandist Edward Bernays when discussing public relations techniques that were described in his essay and book The Engineering of Consent (1955), the public may be manipulated by its subconscious desires to render votes to a political candidate.  Consent thus obtained undermines the legitimacy of government. Bernays claimed that "the basic principle involved is simple but important: If the opinions of the public are to control the government, these opinions must not be controlled by the government."

Edward S. Herman and Noam Chomsky in their book, Manufacturing Consent (1988), advanced a propaganda model for the news media in the United States in which coverage of current events was skewed by corporations and the state in order to manufacture the consent of the governed.

See also 

 Bay'ah
 Consent of the Networked (2012)
 Mandate (politics)
 Manufacturing Consent (1988)
 Nicholas of Cusa (quote)
 Popular sovereignty
 Public policy
 Rule of law
 Self determination
 Self-governance
 Social choice theory
 Social contract

References

Further reading
 John Locke, Second Treatise of Civil Government, chapter 8 section 95 (1690)
 Etienne de La Boétie, Discourse of Voluntary Servitude
 David Hume, Of the Original Contract
 Philip Pettit, Republicanism: A Theory of Freedom and Government. Oxford: Clarendon Press, 1997 (in which he argues, against a theory of the consent of the governed, in favour of a theory of the lack of explicit rebellion; following a Popperian view on falsifiability, Pettit considers that as consent of the governed is always implicitly supposed, thus trapping the social contract in a vicious circle, it should be replaced by the lack of explicit rebellion.
 Jean-Jacques Rousseau, The Social Contract, or Principles of Political Right (1762)

Accountability
Concepts in political philosophy
Concepts in social philosophy
Consent
Popular sovereignty
Political concepts